Como en el Cine is a Mexican telenovela produced by TV Azteca in 2001. Created by Veronica Suarez, it was directed, produced and executive produced by Don Antulio Jimenez Pons. Lorena Rojas and Mauricio Ochmann are the main characters.

Plot

Isabel lives a double life. She pretends to be a successful psychologist when in reality she is a dancer in a bar by night, a fact that she hides with the help of her friends. When she meets Javier, an attractive young man of good family, he falls in love only with Isabel, the successful professional, oblivious to her secret life. "Chabelita", the dancer, must therefore fight for the love of her life. Her situation puts Javier and Isabel into the precarious position of defending their love against the rigid rules imposed by society. Javier lives with his mother Nieves, who holds him responsible for his twin brother's death.  But what Javier doesn't know is that his twin, Joaquin, is very much alive but has no memory of his childhood as part of the Borja family. Joaquin also falls for Isabel despite the fact of learning that his brother is also in love with her.

Cast

Special guest stars
BOOM
Elefante
Filip Kirkorov
Lou Bega
Moneda Dura
OV7
Sergio Dalma
Uff

Theme songs
 Falsas esperanzas
 Singer: Christina Aguilera
 Album: Mi Reflejo
 Written by: Jorge Luis Piloto
 Love Colada
 Singer: OV7
 Written by: Andy Marvel, Amy Powers, Marjorie Mayl

References

2001 telenovelas
2001 Mexican television series debuts
2002 Mexican television series endings
Mexican telenovelas
Spanish-language telenovelas
TV Azteca telenovelas